Fourth Avenue Building may refer to:
1411 Fourth Avenue Building, Seattle, Washington
Fourth Avenue Building, first office of Dollar Bank on 4th Ave. and Smithfield St., Pittsburgh, Pennsylvania
Fourth Avenue Building at Portland State University, Portland, Oregon